A Moment of Romance III is a 1996 Hong Kong romance film directed by Johnnie To starring Andy Lau. Although the third in the series of "A Moment of Romance" films, it shares nothing in terms of characters, plot and setting with the first two films.

Summary
Set during World War II, Lau Tin-Wai (Andy Lau) is a fighter pilot in the Chinese airforce who is forced to ditch in a field; he is taken in by the remote community of farmers who nurse him back to health, and here he meets Ting Siu-Wo, a young woman who falls in love with him.

Statistics
Circuit: Newport

Rating: II A (Hong Kong)

Theatrical run: 28 March 1996 – 24 April 1996

Box Office: HK$14,461,192.00

Cast
 Andy Lau
 Jacklyn Wu
 Alex Fong

References

External links
 

1996 films
1990s Cantonese-language films
Hong Kong romantic drama films
1996 romantic drama films
Films directed by Johnnie To
Films with screenplays by Yau Nai-hoi
1990s Hong Kong films